Eden Lake is a 2008 British horror film. Eden Lake may also refer to:

 Eden Lake, Nova Scotia, a community in Nova Scotia, Canada
 Eden Lake Township, Stearns County, Minnesota, a township in Minnesota, United States

See also
 Lake Eden, a lake in Alberta, Canada